Abdelkader Salhi (born March 19, 1993 in Chlef) is an Algerian footballer who plays as a goalkeeper for Bergantiños FC.

International career
In November 2015, Salhi was selected as part of Algeria's squad for the 2015 Africa U-23 Cup of Nations.

Salhi made his debut for the senior Algeria national football team in a 1-0 2018 FIFA World Cup qualification loss to Zambia on 5 September 2017.

References

External links
 
 

1993 births
Algerian footballers
Algeria international footballers
Algeria A' international footballers
Algeria under-23 international footballers
Algerian Ligue Professionnelle 1 players
Algerian Ligue 2 players
ASO Chlef players
CR Belouizdad players
People from Chlef
Living people
2015 Africa U-23 Cup of Nations players
Footballers at the 2016 Summer Olympics
Olympic footballers of Algeria
Association football goalkeepers
21st-century Algerian people